Diehtosiida is a campus and academic facility situated in Kautokeino, Norway. It houses several Sami academic institutions – the Sámi University College, The Sámi Archives, Inner Finnmark Student Welfare Organization, the language department of the Sami Parliament of Norway, the International Centre for Reindeer Husbandry and the International Resource Centre on Indigenous Rights. The facility opened in 2009.

References

External links

 Official website

Kautokeino
Buildings and structures in Troms og Finnmark
2009 establishments in Norway
University and college campuses in Norway